Salarinae is one of two subfamilies in the combtooth blenny family Blenniidae, it is the largest of the two subfamilies in the Blennidae with 43 genera. The species in this subfamily are mainly marine, with a few species which are found in freshwater or brackish water, and a few species are known to spend much time out of the water.

Classification
The Salarinae was formerly divided into at least two tribes, the Parablenniini and the Salariini, largely based on their dentition. However, the differences between these two tribes were not consistent and that many taxa showed intermediate characteristics and that the subfamily should not be divided into tribes, subject to further study, and that Parablenniini and Salarinae were synonyms.

The following genera are classifies as belonging to the Salarinae:

 Aidablennius Whitley, 1947
 Alloblennius Smith-Vaniz & Springer, 1971
 Alticus Lacepède, 1800
 Andamia Blyth, 1858
 Antennablennius Fowler, 1931
 Atrosalarias Whitley 1933
 Bathyblennius Bath, 1977
 Blenniella Reid, 1943
 Chalaroderma Norman, 1944
 Chasmodes Valenciennes, 1836
 Cirripectes Swainson, 1839
 Cirrisalarias Springer, 1976
 Coryphoblennius Norman, 1944
 Crossosalarias Smith-Vaniz & Springer, 1971
 Dodekablennos Springer & Spreitzer, 1978
 Ecsenius McCulloch, 1923
 Entomacrodus Gill, 1859
 Exallias Jordan & Evermann, 1905
 Glyptoparus J.L.B. Smith, 1959
 Hirculops J.L.B. Smith, 1959
 Hypleurochilus Gill, 1861
 Hypsoblennius Gill, 1861
 Istiblennius Whitley, 1943
 Lipophrys Gill, 1896
 Litobranchus Smith-Vaniz & Springer, 1971
 Lupinoblennius Herre, 1942
 Medusablennius Springer, 1966
 Microlipophrys Almada, Almada, Guillemaud & Wirtz, 2005
 Mimoblennius Smith-Vaniz & Springer, 1971
 Nannosalarias Smith-Vaniz & Springer, 1971
 Ophioblennius Gill, 1860
 Parablennius Miranda Ribeiro, 1915
 Parahypsos Bath, 1982
 Paralticus Springer & Williams, 1994
 Pereulixia J.L.B. Smith, 1959
 Praealticus Schultz & Chapman, 1960
 Rhabdoblennius Whitley, 1930
 Salaria Forsskål, 1775
 Salarias Cuvier, 1816
 Scartella Jordan, 1886
 Scartichthys Jordan & Evermann, 1898
 Stanulus J.L.B. Smith, 1959

References

 
Blenniidae